Kesari ( Sanskrit for lion) is a Marathi newspaper which was founded on 4 January 1881 by Lokmanya Bal Gangadhar Tilak, a prominent leader of the Indian Independence movement. The newspaper was used as a spokes piece for the Indian national freedom movement, and continues to be published by the Kesari Maratha Trust and Tilak's descendants.

Bal Gangadhar Tilak used to run his two newspapers, Kesari, in Marathi and Mahratta (Run by Kesari-Maratha Trust) in English from Kesari Wada, Narayan Peth, Pune. The newspapers were originally started as a co-operative by Chiplunkar, Agarkar and Tilak.

Initial years, editors and writers 
The editors of Kesari included a number of freedom fighters and social activists / reformers, including Agarkar (its first editor), Chiplunkar and Tilak. Agarkar left Kesari in 1887 to start his own news paper, Sudharak (The Reformer) after which Tilak continued to run the paper on his own. Narasimha Chintaman Kelkar, a close associate of Tilak, served as editor twice when Tilak was imprisoned in 1897 and 1908.

Kesari Prosecution of 1897
Bal Gangadhar Tilak mentions that the letter he received from Swami Vivekananda must have been destroyed along with many others after the close of the Kesari Prosecution of 1897.

Present day
An online Marathi periodical called The Daily Kesari continues to be published, edited by Lokmanya Balgangadhar Tilak's great grandson, Deepak Tilak.

Kesari wada and Tilak museum
The wada was originally known as Gaikwadwada, and owned by Sayajirao Gaikwad III the Maharaja of the Princely state of Baroda. It  was sold  to Tilak by the Maharaja in 1905 at a fair price., The original wada (Marathi for courtyard / building) where Tilak published the newspaper still houses the current day offices of Kesari. Along with offices of Kesari, the courtyard contains the Tilak museum and Kesari-Maratha library. These together house mementos of Tilak, including his writing desk, a number of original documents, and the first India national flag which was unfurled by Madame Cama in 1907 in Stuttgart. During Ganapati festival, the Wada is visited by a large number of people.

See also
 List of newspapers in India

References

Marathi-language newspapers
Newspapers published in Maharashtra
Indian independence movement in Maharashtra
1881 establishments in India
Publications established in 1881
Hindu nationalism
Bal Gangadhar Tilak